Rebutia is a genus of flowering plants in the family Cactaceae, native to Bolivia and Argentina. They are generally small, colorful cacti, globular in form, which freely produce flowers that are relatively large in relation to the body. They have no distinctive ribs, but do have regularly arranged small tubercles. They are considered fairly easy to grow and they may produce large quantities of seeds that germinate freely around the parent plant.

The limits of the genus are currently uncertain – in particular whether or not it includes species formerly or currently placed in the genera Aylostera, Cintia, Sulcorebutia and Weingartia. The number of species included varies widely from source to source. A very large number of plants that have been treated in cultivation as species of Rebutia are now generally regarded as varieties, forms or synonyms of a much smaller number of species.

Systematics
The genus was designated in 1895 by Karl Moritz Schumann and named after Pierre Rebut (1828–1902), a French cactus nurseryman. The type species is R. minuscula, which has been in cultivation since 1887.

Limits of the genus
There has been considerable debate about the extent of the genus. In the middle of the twentieth century there was a tendency to separate groups of plants within Rebutia as new genera, e.g. Mediolobivia, whereas towards the end of the century the reverse tendency predominated, with genera previously regarded as separate, such as Weingartia, being subsumed within Rebutia. At the beginning of the twenty-first century there was a broad consensus, as reflected in Kew's list of Vascular Plant Families and Genera, that the following genera should be regarded as synonyms of Rebutia:

Kew's Plants of the World Online accepts Aylostera Speg. and Reicheocactus .

(The generic names Bridgesia, Spegazzinia, Echinorebutia, Eurebutia, Mediorebutia, Neogymnantha and  Setirebutia are invalid, the first two because they are homonyms of Bridgesia Bert. ex Cambess. and Spegazzinia Backeb. respectively, the remainder for lack of any valid publication. Some of these are nevertheless valid names for subdivisions of the genus.)

The history of the taxonomic treatment of the genera Rebutia, Aylostera, Weingartia, Sulcorebutia and Cintia is summarized below.

The variation in the treatment of the genus is illustrated by the difference between Mosti et al., who in 2011 treated Aylostera and Weingartia (including Cintia and Sulcorebutia) as distinct from Rebutia, and the Plant List, which   separated Cintia, Sulcorebutia and Weingartia from Rebutia, but merged Aylostera.

Species

The number of species is similarly debatable, because of disagreement both over what constitutes the genus and what constitutes a species.  A very large number of plants that have circulated as species of Rebutia are now generally regarded as varieties, forms or synonyms of others.  E. F. Anderson recognised forty-one species in 2001. The following species are currently accepted:

Phylogeny
Recent research has indicated that the genus Rebutia as currently defined is polyphyletic. Sulcorebutia and Weingartia were kept as separate genera in the study; a summary cladogram for those species studied is shown below.

Species formerly classified as Weingartia, Sulcorebutia and Cintia show a close relationship to each other and to species of Rebutia with naked pericarpels (Rebutia II), including the type species R. minuscula. The larger group of species of Rebutia studied, those with hairy or bristly pericarpels, form a separate, more distantly related clade (Rebutia'' I). It is suggested that these be excluded from the genus.

Gallery

Rebutia II

Rebutia I - Aylostera, Mediolobivia

Notes and references

External links

Rebutia — Names and Identification
 Cactiguide.com: Rebutia

 
Cacti of South America
Flora of Argentina
Flora of Bolivia
Cactoideae genera